Nallu Indrasena Reddy is an Indian politician from Telangana. He is a national secretary of the Bharatiya Janata Party. He was earlier president of the United state unit of the party. Indrasena Reddy was elected as MLA 3 times first in 1983 at the age of 33, in 1985 from Malakpet in Hyderabad and He was elected again in 1999.

Personal life 
Nallu Indrasena Reddy was born to  Nallu Ram Reddy in Hyderabad present Telangana State.

Political career 
 1983: Member of Legislative Assembly.
 1985: Member of Legislative Assembly.
 1999: Member of Legislative Assembly.
 1999: BJP Floor Leader.
 2003: BJP Andhra Pradesh President.
 2014: National secretary for BJP
 2020: Special Invitee for National Committee.

Assembly member of Malakpet (Assembly constituency)

References

External links 
 

1953 births
Living people
Andhra Pradesh MLAs 1983–1985
Andhra Pradesh MLAs 1985–1989
Andhra Pradesh MLAs 1999–2004
Politicians from Hyderabad, India
Bharatiya Janata Party politicians from Telangana